Arthur George Osborne (14 March 1891 – 15 November 1953) was a New Zealand politician of the Labour Party.

Biography

Early life and career
Osborne was born in Christchurch in 1891. He lived most of his life in Northcote on the North Shore of Auckland. He first found employment as a boot maker before entering the fruit business.

He was a prominent member of the Ancient Order of Foresters and held the highest office in the order, that of High District Chief Ranger. He likewise became a member of various local school committees.

In his youth he was a keen athlete. He played rugby union, rugby league and soccer at competitive levels. He was later a representative member of the Waitemata Bowling Club, and won several trophies.

Political career

From 1933 to 1936 he was a member of the Northcote Borough Council. He resigned upon his election to Parliament.

He was succeeded in Onehunga by Hugh Watt.

Osborne was Parliamentary Under-Secretary to the Prime Minister from 1943 to 1949. As Under-Secretary he was given responsibilities for the administration of New Zealand's island territories. In 1948 he represented New Zealand at the second session of the Cook Islands Legislative Council, initiating discussions with the island administration on issues of agricultural development, public health and education, leading to their improvement.

Death
In early November 1953, Osborne announced he was not seeking re-election and would retire at the 1954 general election due to ill health. His health had declined through the year and he spent most of October and November confined to his bed. Osborne died at his home in Onehunga on 15 November 1953 after a long illness, aged 62. He was survived by his wife, son, daughter and four grandchildren. One son, Gordon Bert Osborne, had predeceased him; he was killed in action at Tobruk during World War II.

Notes

References

|-

1891 births
1953 deaths
Local politicians in New Zealand
New Zealand Labour Party MPs
Members of the New Zealand House of Representatives
New Zealand MPs for Auckland electorates
Unsuccessful candidates in the 1925 New Zealand general election
Unsuccessful candidates in the 1928 New Zealand general election
Unsuccessful candidates in the 1931 New Zealand general election
Unsuccessful candidates in the 1935 New Zealand general election